The 2015 Africa U-23 Cup of Nations was the 2nd edition of the Africa U-23 Cup of Nations, the quadrennial international age-restricted football championship organised by the Confederation of African Football (CAF) for the men's under-23 national teams of Africa. The tournament started on 28 November and finished on 12 December 2015. A total of eight teams are playing in the tournament.

The tournament was initially scheduled to take place in the Democratic Republic of the Congo between 5–19 December 2015. However, CAF changed the hosts and requested Senegal to host the tournament instead, and the tournament dates were also changed.

On 6 August 2015, the CAF Executive Committee decided to change the name of the tournament from the CAF U-23 Championship to the Africa U-23 Cup of Nations, similar to the senior's version, Africa Cup of Nations.

Same as the previous edition, the tournament acted as the CAF qualifiers for the Olympic football tournament. The top three teams of the tournament qualified for the 2016 Summer Olympics men's football tournament in Brazil as the CAF representatives.

Nigeria won the tournament with a 1–0 final win over Algeria. Both finalists and third-placed South Africa qualified for the Olympics.

Qualification

Senegal qualified automatically as hosts, while the remaining seven spots were determined by the qualifying rounds, which took place from April to August 2015.

Qualified teams
The following eight teams qualified for the final tournament. Defending champions Gabon failed to qualify after they lost to Mali.

Venues
The tournament was held in two venues.

Squads

Players born on or after 1 January 1993 were eligible to compete in the tournament. Each squad could contain a maximum of 21 players.

Match officials
A total of 10 referees and 13 assistant referees were selected.

Referees
Redouane Jiyed (Morocco)
Juste Ephrem Zio (Burkina Faso)
Joshua Bondo (Botswana)
Mehdi Abid Charef (Algeria)
Hudu Munyemana (Rwanda)
Antoine Effa (Cameroon)
Hamada Nampiandra (Madagascar)
Bienvenu Sinko (Ivory Coast)
Malang Diedhiou (Senegal)
Youssef Essrayri (Tunisia)

Assistant referees
Jerson dos Santos (Angola)
Arsenio Marengula (Mozambique)
Eldrick Adelaide (Seychelles)
Drissa Kamory Niare (Mali)
Berhe O. Michael (Eritrea)
Yahaya Mahamadou (Niger)
Mark Sonko (Uganda)
Samba Malik (Senegal)
Elmoiz Ali Mohamed Ahmed (Sudan)
Mahmoud Ahmed Abo el Regal (Egypt)
Issa Yaya (Chad)
Oliver Safari (DR Congo)
Sidiki Sidibe (Guinea)

Group stage
The draw for the final tournament of the competition took place on 14 September 2015, 11:00 UTC+2, at the CAF headquarters in Cairo. The eight teams were drawn into two groups of four. For the draw, the hosts Senegal were seeded in position A1 and the previous tournament's best-placed qualified team Egypt were seeded in position B1. The remaining six teams were drawn from one pot to fill the other positions in the two groups.

The top two teams of each group advanced to the semi-finals.

Tiebreakers
The teams were ranked according to points (3 points for a win, 1 point for a draw, 0 points for a loss). If tied on points, tiebreakers would be applied in the following order:
Number of points obtained in games between the teams concerned;
Goal difference in games between the teams concerned;
Goals scored in games between the teams concerned;
If, after applying criteria 1 to 3 to several teams, two teams still have an equal ranking, criteria 1 to 3 are reapplied exclusively to the matches between the two teams in question to determine their final rankings. If this procedure does not lead to a decision, criteria 5 to 7 apply;
Goal difference in all games;
Goals scored in all games;
Drawing of lots.

All times were local, GMT (UTC±0).

Group A

Group B

Knockout stage
In the knockout stage, if a match was level at the end of normal playing time, extra time would be played (two periods of 15 minutes each) and followed, if necessary, by kicks from the penalty mark to determine the winner, except for the third place match where no extra time would be played.

Bracket

Semi-finals
Winners qualified for 2016 Summer Olympics.

Third place play-off
Winner qualified for 2016 Summer Olympics.

Final

Winners

Final ranking
As per statistical convention in football, matches decided in extra time are counted as wins and losses, while matches decided by penalty shoot-outs are counted as draws.

Qualified teams for Olympics
The following three teams from CAF qualified for the Olympic football tournament.

1 Bold indicates champion for that year. Italic indicates host for that year. Statistics include all Olympic format (current Olympic under-23 format started in 1992).

Awards
The following awards were given at the conclusion of the tournament:
Most Valuable Player:  Azubuike Okechukwu
Top Scorer:  Etebo Oghenekaro – 5 goals
Best Goalkeeper:  Abdelkader Salhi
Fair Play:

Goalscorers
5 goals
 Etebo Oghenekaro

2 goals

 Zinedine Ferhat
 Junior Ajayi
 Mouhamadou Diallo
 Ibrahima Keita
 Menzi Masuku
 Gift Motupa
 Haythem Jouini

1 goal

 Mohamed Benkhemassa
 Oussama Chita
 Oussama Darfalou
 Mamdouh Elsayed
 Kahraba
 Ramadan Sobhi
 Souleymane Coulibaly
 Abdoulaye Diarra
 Adama Niane
 Mohammed Usman
 Ibrahima Diédhiou
 Sidy Sarr
 Phumlani Ntshangase
 Ronald Kampamba
 Paul Katema
 Conlyde Luchanga

1 own goal

 Youssouf Traoré (playing against Algeria)
 Oduduwa Segun Tope (playing against Algeria)

References

External links
U-23 Africa Cup Of Nations, CAFonline.com

 
2015
U-23 Cup of Nations
Caf
2015 in Senegalese sport
International association football competitions hosted by Senegal
Football at the Summer Olympics – Men's African Qualifiers
2015 in youth association football